Merchiston International School is an independent boarding school for boys and girls in the Longhua District in Shenzhen, China. It is open to students aged 4 to 18 as either boarding or day students, though the senior school is only for boarding students; it was modelled after English public schools. It is affiliated with, and is the first overseas campus for Merchiston Castle School, in Edinburgh, Scotland.

Background 
In 1828 Charles Chalmers started a small school in Park Place, Edinburgh, Scotland on a site now occupied by the McEwan Hall. In May 1833, Charles Chalmers took a lease of Merchiston Castle (the former home of John Napier, the inventor of logarithms) — which at that time stood in rural surroundings — and moved the school. It is from here that the school name is derived. 

Merchiston Castle School developed Merchiston International School's after a year of collaboration with Chinese investor Lyu Jianjun, whose son attended the boarding school in Edinburgh. In 2016, Shenzhen Merchiston International Education Co. Ltd. was founded, and in August 2018, Merchiston International School opened its doors to pupils as the first school in Longhua District, Shenzhen, Guangdong province, China. On October 15, 2018, the school held its official opening ceremony. The event attracted almost 1,000 attendees, including the Lord Provost of Edinburgh, Frank Ross.

The school offers student living arrangements along with a British education. The school can cater to 1,200 students aged 4–18. Lessons are taught in English and pupils from grades 1 to 9 follow the English national curriculum, with additional access to Mandarin language learning. Senior students study for the IGCSE and A-levels. With accommodations for 600, the senior school is exclusively for boarding students. 80 percent of the teaching staff are from the United Kingdom.

Notes and references

External links
Official School Website 
Merchiston Castle School

Boarding schools in China
Educational institutions established in 2018
2018 establishments in China
British international schools in China
International schools in China